The women's individual compound archery competition at the 2014 Asian Games in Incheon was held from 23 to 27 September at Gyeyang Asiad Archery Field.

A total of 38 archers participated in the qualification round. Only the top two archers from each country progressed to the knockout stage.

Schedule
All times are Korea Standard Time (UTC+09:00)

Results

Ranking round

Knockout round

Finals

Top half

Bottom half

References

External links
Official website

Women's compound individual